The Billboard Argentina Hot 100 is the music industry standard record chart in Argentina for songs, published weekly by Billboard and Billboard Argentina magazines. It ranks the most popular songs in Argentina and is compiled by utilizing a formula blending local streaming activity on leading music services such as YouTube, Spotify and Apple Music, among others, as well as national radio airplay and plays of songs featured on a variety of Argentine TV networks. Streaming data is provided by Nielsen Music, while radio and TV measurement is powered by BMAT/Vericast.

The charted debuted on October 13, 2018 with the first number one song of the chart being "Cuando Te Besé" by Becky G and Paulo Londra. As of the issue for the week ending on March 19, 2023, the Billboard Argentina Hot 100 has had forty-six different number one entries. The song that holds the record for the longest-running number-one single is "Tusa" by Karol G and Nicki Minaj, with 25 weeks. The chart's current number-one song is "En La Intimidad" by Big One, Emilia and Callejero Fino.

Number-one singles
 2018
 2019
 2020
 2021
 2022
 2023

Top-ten singles
 2018
 2019
 2020
 2021
 2022
 2023

Milestones

Most weeks at number one on the Billboard Argentina Hot 100

Notes

Most total weeks in the top ten

Most total weeks on the Argentina Hot 100

Biggest jump to number one

Longest climbs to number one

Biggest single-week upward movements

Biggest single-week downward movements

Biggest drops off the Billboard Argentina Hot 100

Notes

Most number-one singles

Most cumulative weeks at number one

Most Billboard Argentina Hot 100 entries

References

Billboard charts
Lists of number-one songs in Argentina